The Craigie Flour Mill Historical Marker is a wayside rest on Minnesota State Highway 78 in Otter Tail County, Minnesota.  The site was designed by landscape architect Arthur R. Nichols and built by the National Youth Administration and the Minnesota Highway Department.  The style is National Park Service Rustic architecture.

The plaque on the site reads:
Craigie Flour Mill. Near this spot James Craigie of Aberdeen, Scotland, who came to Otter Tail County about 1868 built the first grist mill in the county in 1870. The mill stones and wheel were imported from Scotland. Craigie and his wife were drowned in Otter Tail Lake in 1872 and after long litigation the mill was torn down.
This text was originally printed on a steel sign, measuring 3 feet by 5 feet, which was erected by the Otter Tail County Historical Society and dedicated at a meeting on June 25, 1939 that attracted more than 2000 people.  The steel plaque was replaced the following year with the more permanent wayside rest and monument.

The wayside rest is typical of the designs built by the Minnesota Highway Department around that time, with a curved drive that pulls off the main highway and a monument at the middle of the drive.  The millstones and the iron water wheel are incorporated into the monument, though, which are an unusual feature for the historical markers designed by Nichols.  The Fergus Falls Daily Journal reported that a Mr. Mathews had pulled the millstones from the nearby Balmoral Creek.

References

Buildings and structures on the National Register of Historic Places in Minnesota
Buildings and structures completed in 1940
Buildings and structures in Otter Tail County, Minnesota
New Deal in Minnesota
National Register of Historic Places in Otter Tail County, Minnesota
National Park Service rustic in Minnesota
National Youth Administration
Flour mills in the United States
Roadside parks
Arthur R. Nichols works